The Riverdale School District is a community public school district that serves students in pre-kindergarten through eighth grade from Riverdale, in Morris County, New Jersey, United States.

As of the 2018–19 school year, the district, comprised of one school, had an enrollment of 336 students and 30.8 classroom teachers (on an FTE basis), for a student–teacher ratio of 10.9:1.

The district is classified by the New Jersey Department of Education as being in District Factor Group "FG", the fourth-highest of eight groupings. District Factor Groups organize districts statewide to allow comparison by common socioeconomic characteristics of the local districts. From lowest socioeconomic status to highest, the categories are A, B, CD, DE, FG, GH, I and J.

Public school students in ninth through twelfth grades attend Pompton Lakes High School in Pompton Lakes, as part of a sending/receiving relationship with the Pompton Lakes School District. As of the 2018–19 school year, the high school had an enrollment of 642 students and 52.4 classroom teachers (on an FTE basis), for a student–teacher ratio of 12.3:1.

School
Riverdale Public School had an enrollment of 334 students in grades PreK-8 as of the 2018–19 school year.
Mark Sernatinger, Principal

Administration
Core members of the district's administration are:
Jayson Gutierrez, CPA, Superintendent of Schools
Sandy Vicale, Business Administrator/Board Secretary

Board of education
The district's board of education, comprised of seven members, sets policy and oversees the fiscal and educational operation of the district through its administration. As a Type II school district, the board's trustees are elected directly by voters to serve three-year terms of office on a staggered basis, with either two or three seats up for election each year held (since 2017) as part of the November general election. The board appoints a superintendent to oversee the day-to-day operation of the district.

References

External links
Riverdale Public School

School Data for the Riverdale School District, National Center for Education Statistics

Riverdale, New Jersey
New Jersey District Factor Group FG
School districts in Morris County, New Jersey
Public K–8 schools in New Jersey